Tamirat Gebre Lenga (born October 7, 1993), known professionally as Sancho Gebre, is an Ethiopian singer, choreographer and dancer. As a dancer, he robed a reputation after involving and winning a dance competition in Ethiopian Idol, and as a singer, he became notable after his singles in 2016 and 2017.

Life and career

1993–2008: Early life 
Sancho was born in Wolaita Sodo and raised in Areka. Sancho's interest in art grew from an early age when he is in high school. As he stated in his interviews with Seifu On EBS TV talk show and ARTS TV, he was impersonating Michael Jackson dance by watching his music videos. Then participated in a high school dance contest and won the competition; the competition was a one-day contest. That was the time that let him join the art.

2009–2011: Career beginnings 
In 2009 he started the competition in an Ethiopian Idol as a single modern dance contestant. The competition was ended in 2011 and he was a winner in a single modern dance category.

2016–2020: First singles 
In 2016 Sancho joined the music industry by releasing his debut single, "Ande". Sancho got positive reaction from his debut and the choreography of the music video was popular. He then released four songs titled "Atasayugn", "Tanamo", "Leba" and "Fiyona. He has shown different choreography in his all music videos which are done by himself and participated on all music videos as a dancer too. He is known for his choreography and dances in his music videos.
Popnable stated that Sancho Gebre's songs spent 79 weeks in the music charts. He also contributed choreographing music videos for artists in Ethiopia.

Discography

Singles 
From iTunes
 "Welelaye" (2022)
 "Afe" (2022)
 "Dikida" (2021)
 "Fiyona" (2020)
 "Leba" (2019)
 "Tanamo" (2019)
 "Atasayugn" (2017)
 "Ande" (2016)

References 

1993 births
Wolayita
Living people
21st-century Ethiopian male singers
Ethiopian choreographers
People from Wolayita Zone